Haut-Bocage is a commune in the Allier department of central France. The municipality was established on 1 January 2016 and consists of the former communes of Maillet, Givarlais and Louroux-Hodement.

Politics and administration

List of mayors

Former and delegated communes 
The mayors of the former communes of Maillet, Givarlais and Louroux-Hodement are by right delegated mayors for each of their respective communes.

See also 
Communes of the Allier department

References 

Communes of Allier
Populated places established in 2016

Communes nouvelles of Allier